Dafna Lemish is an Israeli media researcher in the fields of children, youth and leisure culture; as well as construction of gender identity in the media.

She serves as the Dean of the College of Mass Communication and Media Arts, at Southern Illinois University, Carbondale. She is also the founding editor of the Journal of Children and Media. Lemish is 
Associate Dean for Programs at Rutgers University in New Jersey.

Biography 
Dafna Lemish was born in Haifa. She worked at Oranim College teaching media literacy, and later directed the Institute for the Research of Media and the Family, a non-profit organization later integrated within the Israeli Women's Network in Jerusalem, then ceasing to exist independently.
From 1990-1996 she was a Senior Lecturer at The New School of Media Studies, Academic College of Management.
In 1995 she moved to Tel Aviv University, as part of the founding team of the Department of Communication, where she taught until 2010 and served as Chair for 5 years.

In 2010 she accepted a position as Chair of the Department of Radio, television, and Digital media at Southern Illinois University, later becoming the  Dean of the College of Mass Communication and Media Arts. 
Since 2016 she serves as an Associate Dean for Programs at the School of Communication and Information at Rutgers University, and was promoted to Distinguished Professor in 2019. She has been an active member of the International Communication Association since 1980.

She is the founding editor of the Journal of Children and Media.

Awards and recognition 

 Rutgers Board of Trustees Award for Excellence in Research 2020
 The Charles Klotzer International Media Literacy Award, The Gateway Media Literacy Partners, 2015
 Inaugural recipient of the Senior Scholar Award of the Children, Media and Adolescents. Division of the International Communication Association (ICA), 2012.
 Fellow of the International Communication Association (ICA), 2010.
 The first recipient of the Teresa Award for the Advancement of Feminist Scholarship, The Feminist Scholarship Division of the International Communication Association, 2009.

Published works 
Park, J. & Lemish, D. (2019). KakaoTalk and Facebook: Korean American youth constructing hybrid identities. New York, NY: Peter Lang. 
 Götz, M., Lemish, D., Holler, A. (2019). Fear in front of the screen: Children’s fears, nightmares and thrills. New York, NY: Rowman & Littlefield. 249 pages
 Lemish, D.  & Götz, M. (Eds.) (2017). Beyond the stereotypes? Boys, girls, and their images. The International Clearinghouse of Children, Youth and Media, University of Gothenburg, Sweden: Nordicom. 254 pages.
 Lemish, D., Jordan, A., & Rideout, V. (Eds.) (2017). Children, adolescents and media: The future of research and action. NY: Routledge. 286 pages.
 Children and media: A global perspective. Malden, MA: Wiley-Blackwell.
 The Routledge international handbook of children, adolescents and media. New York and Abingdon: Routledge.
 Sexy girls, heroes and funny losers: Gender representations in children´s TV around the world. New York: Peter Lang.
 Lemish, D. (2010). Screening gender in children's TV: The views of producers around the world. New York and Abingdon: Routledge.
 Cohen, A.A., Lemish, D., & Schejter, A. (2008). The wonder phone in the land of miracles: Mobile telephony in Israel. Newark, NJ: Hampton Press.
 Lemish, D. (2007). Children and television: A Global perspective. Oxford, UK: Blackwell.
 Lemish, D. & Götz, M. (Eds.) (2007). Children and media in times of war and conflict. Newark, NJ: Hampton Press.
 Götz, M. Lemish, D. Aidman, A., & Moon, H. (2005). Media and the make-believe worlds of children: When Harry Potter meets Pokémon in Disneyland. New Jersey: Lawrence Erlbaum Associates. 
 UNICEF Communicating with Children: Principles and Practices to Nurture, Inspire, Excite, Educate and Heal.  With Barbara Kolucki (Book and website).

References

External links 

 – Southern Illinois University.
Are there gender differences in media effects? Dafna Lemish, PhD, speaks about her research on gender and media, Boston Children's Hospital.
Ad Hoc Committee on the Internationalization of ICA  – Dafna Lemish (Chair) with members (p. 22–30) International Communication Association 2013 Annual Report.

Israeli mass media people
Living people
Academic staff of Oranim Academic College
1951 births
Academic staff of Tel Aviv University
Southern Illinois University Carbondale faculty